La Flèche Wallonne (French for "The Walloon Arrow") is a men's professional cycle road race held in April each year in Wallonia, Belgium.

The first of two Belgian Ardennes classics, La Flèche Wallonne is today normally held mid-week  between the Amstel Gold Race and Liège–Bastogne–Liège. At one time, La Flèche Wallonne and Liège–Bastogne–Liège were run on successive days as "Le Weekend Ardennais" (both races are organised by Amaury Sport Organisation). Only seven riders have achieved the "Ardennes double" by winning both races in the same year: Alejandro Valverde three times (in 2006, 2015 and 2017), Ferdi Kübler twice (in 1951 and 1952), Stan Ockers (1955), Eddy Merckx (1972), Moreno Argentin (1991) Davide Rebellin (2004) and Philippe Gilbert (2011).

History

La Flèche Wallonne was created to boost the sales of a newspaper Les Sports during the 1930s and was first run in 1936. While perhaps not as revered as one of the Classic 'Monuments', the race is widely regarded as a Classic, and featured on the UCI Road World Cup and UCI ProTour.  It became part of the UCI World Ranking calendar in 2009.

Like many cycle race events, the course has altered considerably over the years, both in route and length. The event was first run on roads from Tournai to Liège (growing from 236 km to 300 km — its longest ever distance — in 1938), after which Mons became the starting point. From 1948, the race started at Charleroi; from 1960 the event ran in the opposite direction, starting at Liège and finishing at Charleroi (or, from 1965, Marcinelle). Some years have seen the event start and finish in the same place: Verviers (1974–1978) or Huy (1983–1985). From 1986, the race started in Spa and finished in Huy. Since 1990, the race distance has not exceeded 210 km.

Since its inception, it has been held every year except 1940, due to World War II. In 2020, it was rescheduled to September due to the COVID-19 pandemic.

Today, the event starts in Charleroi and heads east to Huy, where the riders do three laps of a tough circuit including the steep Mur de Huy (the Wall of Huy) climb, with several sections steeper than 15% and up to 26% on one section. The finish is at the top of the Mur after the third ascent.

Alejandro Valverde has won the race a record five times. Five riders have won the race three times, two of them Belgians, two Italians, and one Frenchman. Five riders have won the race in back to back years. Indeed, Belgian riders dominated the early years of the event, winning the first 11 editions of the race, and slightly less than half of the editions in total (38 victories up to and including 2011). Italians have won the event 18 times.

Winners

Multiple winners 
Riders in italics are still active

Wins per country

References

External links

 Official website
 

 
UCI ProTour races
UCI World Tour races
Classic cycle races
Cycle races in Belgium
Recurring sporting events established in 1936
1936 establishments in Belgium
Annual sporting events in Belgium
La Fleche Wallonne
La Fleche Wallonne
La Fleche Wallonne
Spring (season) events in Belgium
Challenge Desgrange-Colombo races
Super Prestige Pernod races